PAX-interacting protein 1 is a protein that in humans is encoded by the PAXIP1 gene.

Function 

This gene is a member of the paired box (PAX) gene family and encodes a nuclear protein with six BRCT (breast cancer carboxy-terminal) domains. This protein plays a critical role in maintaining genome stability, condensation of chromatin and progression through mitosis. Protein-affecting variants have also been implicated in Alzheimer's disease.

Interactions 

PAXIP1 has been shown to interact with PAX2 and TP53BP1.

References

Further reading